Goudarzi may refer to:
Fatemeh Goudarzi, Iranian actress
Kouhyar Goudarzi, Iranian human rights activist & journalist
Emam-Ali Habibi Goudarzi, Iranian freestyle wrestler
Sadegh Goudarzi, Iranian wrestler
Ali Goudarzi, Iranian footballer
Shahram Goudarzi, Iranian footballer
Mahmoud Goudarzi, Iranian politician &  wrestler